Sigmund Hemmel (1520–1565) was a German composer, tenor, and Kapellmeister in Stuttgart, Württemberg. He was said to have used a "large polished slate stone for composing." He was director of the Hofkapelle Stuttgart from 1552 to 1554. He is perhaps best known for his Das Ganz Psalter Davids, a "collection of four-voiced settings of chorales with melody in the tenor voice according to the old custom" published posthumously by Osiander in Tübingen in 1569.

References

1520 births
1565 deaths
German classical composers
Musicians from Stuttgart
16th-century German people
Renaissance composers
German male classical composers